Miles Bland (11 October 1786 – 27 December 1867) was an English cleric and mathematician.

Life
Bland was educated at St John's College, Cambridge, where he graduated B.A. in 1808, as second wrangler and Smith's prizeman. He was then elected fellow (5 April 1808) and tutor of his college, and acted as moderator (1814, 1815, 1816) and public examiner (1817–1818) in mathematics.

Bland became rector of Lilley, Hertfordshire, in 1823, and a prebendary of Wells Cathedral in 1826, when he proceeded D.D. He was a fellow of the Royal Society, of the Society of Antiquaries of London, and of the Royal Astronomical Society. He died 27 December 1867 in Ramsgate, Kent.

Works
Bland's main works were:

 Geometrical Problems . . . from the first six books of Euclid . . . with the elements of Plane Trigonometry, Cambridge, 1819, 2nd edit. 1821, 3rd edit. 1827. 
 Algebraical Problems, a schoolbook, first published in 1812, 9th edit. 1849. 
 The Elements of Hydrostatics, 1824, 1827. 
 Annotations on the Historical Books of the New Testament; vol. i. St. Matthew's Gospel (1828), vol. ii. St. Mark's Gospel (1828), Mechanical and Philosophical Problems,' 1830.

Notes

 
Attribution
 

1786 births
1867 deaths
19th-century English Anglican priests
Alumni of St John's College, Cambridge
Fellows of St John's College, Cambridge
Fellows of the Royal Society
Fellows of the Society of Antiquaries of London
Fellows of the Royal Astronomical Society